Appleton Township may refer to the following townships:
 Appleton Township, Clark County, Kansas 
 Appleton Township, Swift County, Minnesota
 Appleton Township, St. Clair County, Missouri

See also
 Appleton (disambiguation)

Township name disambiguation pages